Upper Liard (pronounced "lee-ahrd") is a chiefly First Nation settlement immediately west of Watson Lake in Canada's Yukon. It is situated at historical mile 642 of the Alaska Highway. Most of the residents are citizens of the Liard River First Nation, who also prominently populate the Two Mile area just north of Watson Lake.

Demographics 

References

Settlements in Yukon
Kaska Dena